Iznoskovsky District is an administrative and municipal district (raion), one of the twenty-four in Kaluga Oblast, Russia. It is located in the north of the oblast. Its administrative center is the rural locality (a selo) of Iznoski. Population:  7,868 (2002 Census);  The population of Iznoski accounts for 26.8% of the district's population.

References

Notes

Sources

Districts of Kaluga Oblast